Bal Dheri is an area of Bal Dheri Union Council, Abbottabad Tehsil, Abbottabad District, Khyber Pakhtunkhwa, Pakistan. According to the 2017 Census of Pakistan,   the population is 10,619.

References

Populated places in Abbottabad District